Luke Garner (born 6 September 1995) is an Australian professional rugby league footballer who plays as a  forward for the Penrith Panthers in the NRL.

Background
Garner was born in Dubbo, New South Wales, Australia.

He played his junior rugby league for the Bilambil Jets and attended Palm Beach Currumbin State High School before being signed by the Manly-Warringah Sea Eagles.

Playing career

Early career
In 2014, Garner played for the Manly-Warringah Holden Cup (Under-20s) team and played in their 2015 Grand Final team. In 2016, he joined the Sydney Roosters playing predominantly for their Intrust Super Premiership feeder club, the Wyong Roos. In 2017, he joined the Western Suburbs Intrust Super Premiership team.

2018
Garner was made captain of Western Suburbs for 2018. On 24 June, Garner represented the NSW Residents team, scoring a try in the 36-20 victory. Days later he was elevated to a full-time contract with the Wests Tigers. He made his NRL debut in their Round 18 win over the St. George Illawarra Dragons. He continued on to make 6 appearances, 4 of them victories, before the end of the season.

2019
In the 2019 NRL season, Garner played 14 games and scored 7 tries as the Wests Tigers finished 9th on the table.  On 19 November, he signed a two-year contract extension to stay with the club until the end of the 2022 NRL season. He said, "It's awesome. I debuted here at the club and to be honest I couldn't see myself playing anywhere else. I love the boys. I love Madge, I love the coaches, so very happy to stay. I look back in the off-season and came to the realisation of what happened. I was very happy with how my year went."

2020
In round 10, Garner scored two tries as Wests Tigers defeated Brisbane 48-0 at Leichhardt Oval. He scored another double in round 14 against Canterbury-Bankstown, and finished with 6 tries from 17 games. His 7 line-breaks were the most of any forward at the club.

2021
His two tries in the first 30 minutes in round 11 against the New Zealand Warriors was the third double of his career. It also equalled the club record of 15 tries for a backrower.

On 27 July, it was announced that Garner would be ruled out for an indefinite period after suffering a syndesmosis injury.

Garner played 18 matches for the Wests Tigers in the 2021 NRL season as the club finished 13th and missed the finals.

2022
On 24 June, Garner signed a two-year deal with Penrith starting in the 2023 NRL season.
Garner played a total of 20 matches for the Wests Tigers in the 2022 NRL season as the club finished bottom of the table and claimed the Wooden Spoon for the first time.

2023
On 18 February, Garner played in Penrith's 13-12 upset loss to St Helens RFC in the 2023 World Club Challenge.

References

External links

Wests Tigers profile

1995 births
Living people
Australian people of Polish descent
Australian rugby league players
Rugby league players from Dubbo
Rugby league second-rows
Western Suburbs Magpies NSW Cup players
Wests Tigers players
Penrith Panthers players